El Menia is an oasis town and commune, and capital of El Ménia District, in Ghardaïa Province, Algeria. The former name is El Goléa; together in Arabic, the two names mean Impregnable Castle. According to the 2008 census it has a population of 40,195, up from 28,848 in 1998, with an annual growth rate of 3.4%. The area is inhabited by the Zenete Berbers. El Menia oasis grows many agricultural products. The grave of the French priest Charles de Foucauld is located in the town.

Geography 

The town is a gateway to the Sahara in the south, and has an estimated 180,000 palm trees within the oasis area. Some of the largest continuous areas of Saharan sand dunes begin just a few kilometres to the west of the oasis.

Climate 

El Menia has a hot desert climate (Köppen climate classification BWh), with long, extremely hot summers and short, warm winters. There is very little rain throughout the year, and summers are especially dry. Summer daytime temperatures are known to consistently approach . The sky is clear throughout the year and sunny, bright days are guaranteed.

Transportation 

El Menia has good road connections along the N1 highway to Ghardaïa to the north and In Salah to the south.

Education 

6.9% of the population has a tertiary education, and another 17.3% has completed secondary education. The overall literacy rate is 81.4%, and is 85.4% among males and 77.2% among females.

Localities 
The commune of El Menia is composed of 12 localities:

 Centre-ville
 Taghit
 Belbachir
 Hoffrat El Abbas
 Vieux Ksar
 Badriane
 Belaïd
 Zouitel
 Ouled Zid
 Tin Bouzid
 Ksar Belkacem
 Ouled Feradj

References 

Neighbouring towns and cities

El Ménia District
Oases of Algeria
Communes of Ghardaïa Province
Ghardaïa Province